Island Park is a city in Fremont County, Idaho, United States. The city's population was 286 at the 2010 census, up from 215 in 2000. The city was incorporated by owners of the many lodges and resorts along U.S. Route 20 in 1947, primarily to circumvent Idaho's liquor laws that prohibited the sale of liquor outside of city limits.

Island Park is part of the Rexburg Micropolitan Statistical Area.

Geography

City geography

Regional geography
The area was known as Island Park long before the -long town was incorporated. The area known as Island Park is mostly a large crater or caldera named the Henry's Fork Caldera that was created by the same hotspot that created the earlier Island Park Caldera and the later Yellowstone Caldera.
 
In addition to the portion which lies on the Henry's Fork Caldera, about a third of what is known as Island Park is north of the caldera, extending across Henry's Lake Flat and Henry's Lake towards the Idaho/Montana border. Henry's Lake Flat is a flat bottomed valley between high mountain ranges, with Henrys Lake at the northwest end of the flats. The most famous of Island Park's peaks, however, is the  Sawtell Peak, south of Henrys Lake near Mount Jefferson. The peak is known for its beauty and is named for a perceived resemblance to a Native American chief's profile while napping. The peak has also been called Chief Rains in the Face. Sawtell Peak is topped by a FAA radar dome and is visible from nearly anywhere in Island Park.

Although much smaller than either the Island Park Caldera or the Yellowstone Caldera, the Henry's Fork Caldera is still one of the largest calderas in the world and is the only large caldera in the Yellowstone region that is plainly visible. The Henry's Lake Flat area, north of the caldera, is a little higher.

The Island Park area is mostly forested with many meadows and grasslands. It is mostly level, but is surrounded by forested hills and high mountains in the north. The Henrys Fork of the Snake River meanders through Island Park with its headwaters at Henry's Lake and at Big Springs (Idaho). The Henry's Fork is impounded by Island Park Dam to form Island Park Reservoir outside the north rim of the caldera. In fact, the entire south bank of Island Park Reservoir is formed by the northern slope of the caldera. The Henry's Fork crosses through the caldera and then cascades off from it at Upper and Lower Mesa Falls.

The geography of Island Park is actually unique and distinctive. It is largely flat and it has unusually high precipitation. That is, Island Park has three times the rainfall and snowfall as nearby areas of the same elevation.

The Snake River Plain that was also formed by the Yellowstone hotspot aligns with the gap between the Sierra Nevada and Cascade mountain ranges along the West Coast of the United States so that there is a moisture channel that extends from the distant Pacific Ocean, between the Cascades and Sierra Nevada, through the Rocky Mountains to Island Park.

This abundant precipitation in Island Park falls on the relatively level floor of the caldera, where it forms numerous meandering streams, ponds, marshes, and meadows. It also falls on the higher areas to the east along the Yellowstone Park border, where it percolates though the granular volcanic deposits to emerge as some of the largest springs in the world. Big Springs, Buffalo River Springs, and Warm River Springs all are 1st Magnitude springs, and they form some of the crystal clear meandering streams that the area is famous for.

Demographics

2010 census
As of the census of 2010, there were 286 people, 122 households, and 74 families residing in the city. The racial makeup of the city was 96.9% White, 0.7% Native American, 1.7% from other races, and 0.7% from two or more races. Hispanic or Latino of any race were 6.6% of the population.

There were 122 households, of which 19.7% had children under the age of 18 living with them, 55.7% were married couples living together, 2.5% had a female householder with no husband present, 2.5% had a male householder with no wife present, and 39.3% were non-families. 33.6% of all households were made up of individuals, and 5% had someone living alone who was 65 years of age or older. The average household size was 2.28 and the average family size was 2.97.

The median age in the city was 45 years. 19.2% of residents were under the age of 18; 6.2% were between the ages of 18 and 24; 24.4% were from 25 to 44; 34.2% were from 45 to 64; and 15.7% were 65 years of age or older. The gender makeup of the city was 53.5% male and 46.5% female.

2000 census
As of the census of 2000, there were 215 people, 90 households, and 57 families residing in the city. The racial makeup of the city was 95.81% White, 0.93% Asian, 2.33% from other races, and 0.93% from two or more races. Hispanic or Latino of any race were 4.19% of the population.

There were 90 households, out of which 22.2% had children under the age of 18 living with them, 55.6% were married couples living together, 6.7% had a female householder with no husband present, and 35.6% were non-families. 27.8% of all households were made up of individuals, and 2.2% had someone living alone who was 65 years of age or older. The average household size was 2.39 and the average family size was 2.93.

In the city, the population was spread out, with 19.5% under the age of 18, 11.2% from 18 to 24, 27.4% from 25 to 44, 28.4% from 45 to 64, and 13.5% who were 65 years of age or older. The median age was 42 years. For every 100 females, there were 112.9 males. For every 100 females age 18 and over, there were 119.0 males.

The median income for a household in the city was $26,250, and the median income for a family was $30,000. Males had a median income of $22,292 versus $16,250 for females. The per capita income for the city was $15,617. About 21.0% of families and 23.9% of the population were below the poverty line, including 37.9% of those under the age of eighteen and none of those 65 or over.

Climate
Island Park has a humid continental climate (Dsb), bordering on a subarctic climate (Dsc). Summer days are usually warm, with nights dropping to temperatures around 40, while winters are very cold, with massive yearly snowfall averaging 215 inches (546 cm). It is the site of Idaho's lowest recorded temperature, on January 18, 1943.

Assimilated communities
In addition to the former unincorporated community, Island Park, for which the incorporated city was named, the city either originally included, or subsequently added, several other formerly unincorporated communities:

 Flat Rock (also known as Macks Inn)
 Lake
 Last Chance
 Staley Springs

Transportation

Airport
Island Park is served by Henry's Lake Airport, which is not located within the city limits, but just west and south of the northern end of the city.

Roads
Island Park is currently served by one U.S. Highway and one state highway; and was previously served by another U.S. Highway and another state highway:
Current highways
 , which runs north–south through the most of the city
 , which begins in the northern part of the city and runs northwest through the northern part of the city and on to Montana
Former highways
  (1926–1981), the former routing of this highway follows the current route of US-20 this part of Idaho; in 1981 with the completion of Interstate 15, US-191 was rerouted such that it no longer enters Idaho 
 , formerly ran the length of South Big Springs Loop (from US-20 in the Flat Rock area of the city [also known as Macks Inn] easterly to Henrys Fork); this route has since been decommissioned

See also

 List of cities in Idaho

References

External links

 
Cities in Idaho
Cities in Fremont County, Idaho
Rexburg, Idaho micropolitan area
1947 establishments in Idaho